Nucleoporin 35 (Nup35) is a protein that in humans is encoded by the NUP35 gene.

Background 
This gene encodes a member of the nucleoporin family. The protein is localized to the nuclear rim and is part of the nuclear pore complex (NPC). All molecules entering or leaving the nucleus either diffuse through or are actively transported by the NPC.

References

Further reading

External links 
 

Nuclear pore complex